Cryptofusus is a monospecific  genus of large sea snails with a gill and an operculum, marine gastropod mollusks in the family Turbinellidae.

Distribution
This marine species can be found along New Zealand

Species
 Cryptofusus cryptocarinatus (Dell, 1956)

References

External links
 

Turbinellidae